() is a typical, traditional Korean accessory used in , which can be hung on  (coat strings) of a woman's  or on her . The  functions as a decorative pendant and is both a good-luck charm hoped to bring something such as eternal youth, wealth or many sons (depending on its shape), as well as a fashion accessory.

Terminology 
The word  originally referred to “pretty and playful objects” or "favourite trinkets" signifying women's liking for the tassel charm regardless of social ranks.

History

Origins 
It is also difficult to pinpoint the exact time when the  started to be widely used. 

Some sources state that the  might have been a protective emblem called  used in primitive shamanism and was worn initially worn by children. However, the true archetype of  appears to be the waist pendant worn in the Silla period.

Joseon 
The  also served to distinguish social ranks and social status. The  could also be used as a chest or a waist decorations.

Composition 
The  is composed by three basic parts: the main ornament, elaborate knots, the tassel on the lowest part.

The  have various shapes derived from nature or from everyday life.

Main Ornament 
The main ornament, for making  is usually using gold, silver, jewels, and precious stone.

The motifs of main ornament are cut down into 5 basic branches, such as animal, plants, daily objects, characters, and religious symbols. For example, some auspicious characters include the Chinese character, 《》which represents longevity. The religious symbols are typically motifs that represents Buddhism.

Knots 
The  uses coloured cord to braid into various shapes. The type of knot has to follow the design of main ornament. The big size of the main ornament parts will combine with small knots. The small main ornament comes along with large knots.

Tassel 
The , which are tassels, are made out of silk thread with coloured and place at the lower parts.

The purpose is to attach the  together and be able to hang on the clothes.

Similar items 

  – a Chinese fashion item used to decorate the lapel of Chinese upper garments

See also 
 Chima
 Jokduri
 Jeogori

References 

Korean clothing
Fashion accessories